Elisabeth Andreasson is the 1985 self-titled studio album by Elisabeth Andreasson.

Track listing

Side A
"Stanna"
"Ängel i natt" (The Power of Love)
"Lätta vingar"
"Kom hem igen"
"Some Boys"
"Det kan aldrig bli du"

Side B
"Tissel Tassel"
"We'll Make It" (duet with Jan Andreasson)
"Du bryr dig inte om"
"Is It Over"
"Vi passerar Gå"

References 

1985 albums
Elisabeth Andreassen albums